Ichchhe Ghuri (English: Ship-borne) is the second album by the Bengali psychedelic rock band Shironamhin. G-Series released the album on 1 May 2006 in the Bangladesh.

Background 
Ichchhe Ghuri, was 2nd album by Shironamhin released by the record label co. G-Series on 1 May 2006.

Track listing 
Of the album's ten songs, five were written by Ziaur Rahman Zia, two were written by Farhan. Three were written by Tanzir Tuhin and Tusar.

Personnel 

 Tanzir Tuhin — vocal
 Ziaur Rahman Zia — bass guitar
 Farhan Karim — sarod, vocal
 Kazi Ahmad Shafin — drums
 Tushar — guitar
 Razib — keyboard

References

External links 
 

Shironamhin albums
2006 debut albums
Bengali music